Aaron Trahair (born 3 February 1976) is an Australian former professional basketball player.

Career
Before beginning his career in the NBL, Trahair attended the Australian Institute of Sport in 1992 and 1993. He began his NBL career with the Perth Wildcats in 1994, and was named runner-up to Sam Mackinnon in the Rookie of the Year award for that season. The following year, Trahair was a member of the Australian under 19's team that won silver at the Junior World Championships, and won his only NBL championship with the Wildcats. In doing so, he was a member of the Wildcats squad that travelled to the McDonald's Championship in London that competed against the NBA's Houston Rockets and Spain's Real Madrid.

In 1997, Trahair headed east to play with the Sydney Kings where he remained until the conclusion of the 1999–2000 season. Over the next several years, Trahair played a series of short stints with numerous fledgling NBL clubs including the Cairns Taipans, West Sydney Razorbacks, Hunter Pirates, and the Singapore Slingers.

Prior to the commencement of the 2007–08 season, the unsigned Trahair trained and appeared in several pre-season matches with the Wildcats while in Perth visiting family. Despite early reports that the Wildcats would not sign Trahair (as they held out for the possibility that American forward Shawn Redhage would become an Australian citizen), the guard was officially signed up shortly before the first match of the season against his previous club, the Singapore Slingers. However, after appearing in just eight games with limited minutes for the Wildcats, Trahair was released by the club in December 2007 to allow him to sign with the Wollongong Hawks for the remainder of the season.

In 2007 and 2008, Trahair played in the State Basketball League (SBL) for the Rockingham Flames, then between 2009 and 2013, he played for the Mandurah Magic.

In 2015, Trahair served as an assistant coach for the Rockingham Flames men's team. In 2016, he served as head coach of the Geraldton Buccaneers. Between 2017 and 2022, he served as head coach of the Mandurah Magic men's team.

References

External links
NBL stats

1976 births
Living people
Australian men's basketball players
Australian Institute of Sport basketball players
Cairns Taipans players
Hunter Pirates players
Perth Wildcats players
Shooting guards
Singapore Slingers players
Small forwards
Basketball players from Melbourne
Sydney Kings players
West Sydney Razorbacks players
Wollongong Hawks players